Eakpracha Meenayothin (Thai: เอกประชา มีนะโยธิน) is a Thai Muay Thai kickboxer. He is the Lumpinee Stadium, WMC and Thailand Welterweight Champion. He is also two times Toyota Vigo Marathon Tournament Champion.

Biography and career
Aikpracha often uses his elbows in fighting techniques, especially 'Tatmala' (Poke back up) which he often makes in exit of clinch.. He currently holds the belt of Lumpinee and the belt of Thailand, two prestigious belts.

Eakpracha is of the same level as Kem Sitsongpeenong, Superball Lookjaomaesaivaree, Singmanee Sor Srisoopong or still the star Buakaw Por. Pramuk. He already has to face foreigners in Thailand, he beat the Iranian Vahid Rossani, French Antuan Siangboxing, a technician who lives in Thailand, and the Swedish Tobias Alexander, whom he beat by KO in the 1st round.

He faced Yohan Lidon at Thai Fight: Lyon on September 19, 2012 in Lyon, France, and won via decision after three rounds.

He beat Jordan Watson on points in Bangkok on December 15, 2012.

He TKO'd Frank Giorgi in the second round at Yokkao Extreme 2013 in Milan, Italy on January 26, 2013.

Just a week later, Aikpracha fought in a 72.5 kg tournament at La Nuit des Titans in Tours, France on February 2, 2013. He faced Yury Bessmertny in the semi-finals and won rounds one and three but was floored in the second and so the match went to an extension round to decide the victor. Aikpracha won this round with ease and so marched into the final against Karim Ghajji. Despite being the favourite to win the tournament he was brutally knocked out by Ghajji in the first round with a high kick, straight left, knee and right hand combination.

On May 6, 2013, Aikpracha fought to a draw with Enriko Kehl at MAX Muay Thai 1 in Surin, Thailand.

He soundly beat Warren Stevelmans to a decision win at MAX Muay Thai 2 in Pattaya, Thailand on June 29, 2013.

He was set to rematch Jordan Watson at MAX Muay Thai 3 in Zhengzhou, China on August 10, 2013. However, he was replaced by Sitthichai Sitsongpeenong for undisclosed reasons.

He beat Tamoaki Makino by decision at MAX Muay Thai 4 in Sendai, Japan on October 6, 2013.

He beat Tomoyuki Nishikawa by TKO due to a cut in round one at MAX Muay Thai 5: The Final Chapter in Khon Kaen, Thailand on December 10, 2013.

He signed with Glory in late January 2014 and won by split decision in his promotional debut against Albert Kraus at Glory 14: Zagreb in Zagreb, Croatia on March 8, 2014.

Aikpracha faced Youssef Boughanem at MAX Muay Thai 7 in Bangkok, Thailand on March 29, 2014.

Titles and achievements
 2015 Final Legend 4 man tournament Champion (-70 kg)
 2013 La Nuit des Titans Tournament Runner Up (-72.5 kg)
 2012 WMC Prince's Cup Tournament Champion (-72 kg)
 2012 Muaythai belt (-67 kg)
 2012 Lumpinee Stadium Welterweight Champion (147 lbs)
 2011 Toyota Vigo Marathon Tournament Champion (154 lbs)
 2010 WMC Welterweight World Muaythai Champion (147 lbs)
 2010 Toyota Vigo Marathon Tournament Champion (154 lbs)
 2010 Champion of Thailand (147 lbs)
 S1 Muaythai Tournament Champion (115 lbs)

Muaythai record

|-
|-  style="background:#fbb;"
| 2017-12-17 || Loss ||align=left| Nurla Mulali || Kunlun Fight 68 || Sanya, China || Decision || 3 || 3:00
|-
|-  style="background:#fbb;"
| 2016-06-25 || Loss ||align=left| Masoud Minaei || FF Fight  || Shanghai, China || KO (High Kick) || 1 || 2:10
|-
|-  bgcolor="#CCFFCC"
| 2016-05-28 || Win ||align=left| Adam || Extreme Fighting Warrior Hero World Series || Nanchang, China || KO || 1 ||
|-  style="background:#fbb;"
| 2016-01-23 || Loss ||align=left| Dzhabar Askerov || Kunlun Fight 37 || Sanya, China || KO (right hook) || 2 || 2:12
|- 
|-  bgcolor="#CCFFCC"
| 2015-12-28 || Win ||align=left| Sanny Dahlbeck || Topking World Series 8 || Pattaya, Thailand || TKO || 2 ||
|-  style="background:#cfc;"
| 2015-09-04|| Win||align=left| Pavel Dzialendzik || Topking World Series 5 & Kunlun Fight 30 || Zhoukou, China || KO(Left Elbow) || 1 || 2:01
|-  style="background:#cfc;"
| 2015-06-11|| Win ||align=left| Andrei Kulebin || Final Legend, Final || Macao, China || Decision || 3 || 3:00
|-
! style=background:white colspan=9 |
|-  style="background:#cfc;"
| 2015-06-11|| Win ||align=left| Gaetam Dambo || Final Legend, Semi Finals || Macao, China || Decision || 3 || 3:00
|-  style="background:#fbb;"
| 2015-02-01 || Loss ||align=left| Marat Grigorian || Kunlun Fight 18: The Return of the King - Tournament, Semi Finals || Guangzhou, China || KO (Right hook) || 2 ||
|-  style="background:#fbb;"
| 2015-01-04 || Loss ||align=left| Steve Moxon || Kunlun Fight 18: The World MAX Return || Nanjing, China || Ext. R. Decision || 4 || 3:00
|-  style="background:#fbb;"
| 2014-11-16 || Loss ||align=left| Dzianis Zuev || Kunlun Fight 13 - World MAX 2014, Semi Finals || Hohhot, China || KO (punch) || 3 ||  
|-
|-  style="background:#cfc;"
| 2014-10-05 || Win ||align=left| Dylan Salvador || Kunlun Fight 11 - World MAX 2014 Final 8 || Macao, China || Decision || 3 || 3:00
|-  style="background:#cfc;"
| 2014-07-27 || Win ||align=left| Roman Mailov || Kunlun Fight 7 - World MAX 2014 Final 16 || Zhoukou, China || Decision || 3 || 3:00
|-  style="background:#cfc;"
| 2014-03-29 || Win ||align=left| Youssef Boughanem || MAX Muay Thai 7 || Paris, France || Decision || 5 || 3:00
|-  style="background:#cfc;"
| 2014-03-08 || Win ||align=left| Albert Kraus || Glory 14: Zagreb || Zagreb, Croatia || Decision (split) || 3 || 3:00
|-  style="background:#cfc;"
| 2013-12-10 || Win || style="text-align:left;"| Tomoyuki Nishikawa || MAX Muay Thai 5: The Final Chapter || Khon Kaen, Thailand || TKO (cut) || 1 || 
|-  style="background:#cfc;"
| 2013-10-06 || Win || style="text-align:left;"| Tamoaki Makino || MAX Muay Thai 4 || Sendai, Japan || Decision || 3 || 3:00
|-  style="background:#cfc;"
| 2013-06-29 || Win ||align=left| Warren Stevelmans || MAX Muay Thai 2 || Pattaya, Thailand || Decision || 3 || 3:00
|-  style="background:#c5d2ea;"
| 2013-05-06 || Draw ||align=left| Enriko Kehl || MAX Muay Thai 1 || Surin, Thailand || Draw || 3 || 3:00 
|-  style="background:#fbb;"
| 2013-02-02 || Loss ||align=left| Karim Ghajji || La Nuit des Titans, Finals || Tours, France || KO (left knee and right overhand) || 1 ||  
|-
! style=background:white colspan=9 |
|-  style="background:#cfc;"
| 2013-02-02 || Win ||align=left| Yury Bessmertny || La Nuit des Titans, Semi Finals || Tours, France || Extension round decision || 4 || 3:00 
|-  style="background:#cfc;"
| 2013-01-26 || Win ||align=left| Frank Giorgi || Yokkao Extreme 2013 || Milan, Italy || TKO (high kick) || 2 || 
|-  style="background:#cfc;"
| 2012-12-15 || Win ||align=left| Jordan Watson || || Bangkok, Thailand || Decision || 5 || 3:00
|-  style="background:#cfc;"
| 2012-09-19 || Win ||align=left| Yohan Lidon || Thai Fight: Lyon || Lyon, France || Decision || 3 || 3:00
|-  style="background:#cfc;"
| 2012-07-27 || Win ||align=left| Thiago Teixeira || WMC Prince's Cup 2012, Final || Bangkok, Thailand ||Decision (Unanimous)  || 5 ||3:00
|-
! style=background:white colspan=9 |
|-  style="background:#cfc;"
| 2012-07-27 || Win ||align=left| Marco Piqué || WMC Prince's Cup 2012, Semi Final || Bangkok, Thailand ||KO  || 1 || 
|-  style="background:#cfc;"
| 2012-06-14 || Win ||align=left| Youssef Boughanem || Best of Siam || Paris, France || TKO (Dislocated Shoulder) ||2  || 
|-  style="background:#cfc;"
| 2012-03-17 || Win ||align=left| Fabio Pinca || La Nuit des Titans || Tours, France  || Decision (Unanimous) || 5 || 3:00
|-
! style=background:white colspan=9 |
|-  style="background:#cfc;"
| 2012-02-11 || Win ||align=left| Prakysiang Kaiyanghadaogym || Siam Boxing Stadium || Bangkok, Thailand  || KO || 1 || 
|-
! style=background:white colspan=9 |
|-  style="background:#cfc;"
| 2012-01-03 || Win ||align=left| Prakysiang Kaiyanghadaogym || Petchyindee Fight, Lumpinee Stadium || Bangkok, Thailand || Decision || 5 || 3:00
|-  style="background:#cfc;"
| 2011-11-10 || Win ||align=left| Dong Wenfei || Chinese Kung Fu vs Muaythai || Hainan, China || TKO || 2 || 
|-  style="background:#fbb;"
| 2011-10-28 || Loss ||align=left| Prakysiang Kaiyanghadaogym || Toyota Vigo Marathon 2011 (-72 kg), Semi Final || Nakhon Ratchasima, Thailand || Decision ||  || 
|-  style="background:#cfc;"
| 2011-10-28 || Win ||align=left| Tobias Alexander || Toyota Vigo Marathon 2011 (-72 kg), Quarter Final || Nakhon Ratchasima, Thailand || TKO || 1 || 
|-  style="background:#cfc;"
| 2011-09-30 || Win ||align=left| Kongjak Sor. Tuantong || Petchyindee Fight, Lumpinee Stadium || Bangkok, Thailand || Decision || 5 || 3:00
|-  style="background:#cfc;"
| 2011-07-16 || Win ||align=left| William Sriyapai || Push Kick Promotions "World Stand Off" || Pomona, California || TKO || 3 || 0:58
|-  style="background:#fbb;"
| 2011-05-24 || Loss ||align=left| Superball Lookjaomaesaivaree || Wanweraphon Fight, Lumpinee Stadium || Bangkok, Thailand || Decision || 5 || 3:00
|-  style="background:#cfc;"
| 2011-04-26 || Win ||align=left| Petchmankong Kaiyanghadaogym || Petchpiya Fight, Lumpinee Stadium || Bangkok, Thailand || TKO || 5 || 
|-  style="background:#cfc;"
| 2011-03-25 || Win ||align=left| Yassine Darkrim || Toyota Vigo Marathon 2011 (-70 kg), Final || Saraburi Province, Thailand || TKO (Lowkicks) || 2 || 
|-
! style=background:white colspan=9 |
|-  style="background:#cfc;"
| 2011-03-25 || Win ||align=left| Mickael Lallemand || Toyota Vigo Marathon 2011 (-70 kg), Semi Final || Saraburi Province, Thailand || TKO || 1 || 
|-  style="background:#cfc;"
| 2011-03-25 || Win ||align=left| Jorge Asensi || Toyota Vigo Marathon 2011 (-70 kg), Quarter Final || Saraburi Province, Thailand || TKO || 1 || 
|-  style="background:#fbb;"
| 2011-01-13 || Loss ||align=left| Sitthichai Sitsongpeenong || Rajadamnern Stadium || Bangkok, Thailand || Decision || 5 || 3:00
|-  style="background:#cfc;"
| 2010-12-04 || Win ||align=left| Yodkhunphon F.A.Group || Omnoi Boxing Stadium || Bangkok, Thailand || TKO || 2 || 
|-
! style=background:white colspan=9 |
|-  style="background:#cfc;"
| 2010-10-29 || Win ||align=left| Vahid Rossani || Toyota Vigo Marathon 2010, Final || Udon Thani, Thailand || Decision || 5 || 3:00
|-
! style=background:white colspan=9 |
|-  style="background:#cfc;"
| 2010-10-29 || Win ||align=left| Antuan Siangboxing || Toyota Vigo Marathon 2010, Semi Final || Udon Thani, Thailand || Decision (2-1) || 5 || 3:00
|-  style="background:#cfc;"
| 2010-10-29 || Win ||align=left| Emad Saber || Toyota Vigo Marathon 2010, Quarter Final || Udon Thani, Thailand || TKO (Punches) || 2 || 
|-  style="background:#cfc;"
| 2010-09-22 || Win ||align=left| Kongjak Sor. Tuantong || Daorungprabath Fight, Rajadamnern Stadium || Bangkok, Thailand || Decision || 5 || 3:00
|-  style="background:#cfc;"
| 2010-07-14 || Win ||align=left| Farsura Wor.Phetpoon || Wanmitchai Fights, Rajadamnern Stadium || Bangkok, Thailand || Decision || 5 || 3:00
|-  style="background:#fbb;"
| 2009-05-23 || Loss ||align=left| Vladimír Moravčík || Profiliga Muay Thai IX || Banská Bystrica, Slovakia || Decision || 5 || 3:00
|-  style="background:#fbb;"
| 2006-02-02 || Loss ||align=left| Lamtong 13Reanresort || Phettongkham Fights, Rajadamnern Stadium || Bangkok, Thailand || Decision || 5 || 3:00
|-  style="background:#cfc;"
| 2005-11-22 || Win ||align=left| Chatree P.Laser || P.Pramuk Fights, Lumpinee Stadium || Bangkok, Thailand || Decision || 5 || 3:00
|-  style="background:#fbb;"
| 2005-08-19 || Loss ||align=left| Loh-ngern Pitakkruchaidan|| Phetsupapan Fights, Lumpinee Stadium || Bangkok, Thailand || Decision || 5 || 3:00
|-  style="background:#cfc;"
| 2005-07-20 || Win ||align=left| Dendanai Kiatsakkongka || Daorungchujarean Fights, Rajadamnern Stadium || Bangkok, Thailand || Decision || 5 || 3:00
|-  style="background:#cfc;"
| 2005-05-05 || Win ||align=left| Kompayak Fairtex || Phettongkam Fights, Rajadamnern Stadium || Bangkok, Thailand || Decision || 5 || 3:00
|-  style="background:#cfc;"
| 2005-04-04 || Win ||align=left| Pirabkao P.Pleya || S.Wanchard Fights, Rajadamnern Stadium || Bangkok, Thailand || Decision || 5 || 3:00
|-  style="background:#fbb;"
| 2004-09-16 || Loss ||align=left| Rungruanglek Lukprabat || Wansongchai Fights, Rajadamnern Stadium || Bangkok, Thailand || Decision || 5 || 3:00
|-  style="background:#cfc;"
| 2004-08-05 || Win ||align=left| Orono Mueangsima || Wansongchai Fights, Rajadamnern Stadium || Bangkok, Thailand || Decision || 5 || 3:00
|-  style="background:#fbb;"
| 2004-06-03 || Loss ||align=left| Rungruanglek Lukprabat || Wansongchai Fights, Rajadamnern Stadium || Bangkok, Thailand || Decision || 5 || 3:00
|-  style="background:#cfc;"
| 2004-05-03 || Win ||align=left| Wannar Kaewnorasing || Wansongchai Fights, Rajadamnern Stadium || Bangkok, Thailand || Decision || 5 || 3:00
|-  style="background:#cfc;"
| 2004-04-05 || Win ||align=left| Rittijak Kaewsamrit || Wansongchai Fights, Rajadamnern Stadium || Bangkok, Thailand || Decision || 5 || 3:00
|-  style="background:#cfc;"
| 2004-03-04 || Win ||align=left| Pandin S.Damrongrit || Wansongchai Fights, Rajadamnern Stadium || Bangkok, Thailand || Decision || 5 || 3:00
|-  style="background:#fbb;"
| 2003-12-07 || Loss ||align=left| Hongdeang K.Bangkui || Rajadamnern Stadium || Bangkok, Thailand || Decision || 5 || 3:00
|-  style="background:#fbb;"
| 2003-10-28 || Loss ||align=left| Pesarddeang K.Bankkui || Lumpinee Stadium || Bangkok, Thailand || KO || 2 ||
|-  style="background:#cfc;"
| 2003-08-28 || Win ||align=left| Tapraya Kimcheangkorsang || Rajadamnern Stadium || Bangkok, Thailand || Decision || 5 || 3:00
|-
| colspan=9 | Legend:

See also
List of male kickboxers

References

1985 births
Living people
Welterweight kickboxers
Aikpracha Meenayothin
Glory kickboxers
Kunlun Fight kickboxers